Palakunnathu Abraham Malpan (പാലകുന്നത്ത് അബ്രഹാം മൽപ്പാൻ),  (30 May 1796 – 9 September 1845) was an Indian cleric and theologian known for the Reformation movement within the Malankara Church during the 19th century. He was born in the ancient Syrian Christian Palakunnathu family which practiced West Syriac Rite Oriental Orthodoxy after the Coonan Cross Oath of 1653.

Abraham Malpan translated and revised the West Syriac liturgy, restoring the Church to what he considered to be its position before the Synod of Diamper in 1599. He therefore strove for the abolition of auricular confession, prayers for the dead, intercession of saints, and veneration of sacraments. Further he emphasized the reading and study of the Bible, family-worship and evangelistic work. He insisted on a high moral standard of conduct for laity and clergy. All this created a ferment in the Church and its effects are still discernible in the Malankara Church as a whole. This led to the formation of the Malankara Mar Thoma Syrian Church in 1898.

Early days

Palakunnathu Family 
In the seventeenth century, a member of the Panamkuzhy family (a branch of the Pakalomattam family), came and settled in Kozhencherry on the banks of river Pampa. Later they moved to Maramon, and lived at Chackkalyil, on the other side of the river. The second son in that family, Mathen moved to the nearby Palakunnathu house. His fifth son was a celibate priest (sanyasi achen). As was the custom, His youngest son Mathew lived at Palakunnathu family house. (This house still exists). His second son Abraham Malpan later moved to Palakunnathu Kuzhiathu house.

A number of Malankara Syrian Church leaders were born in this family like Mathews Mar Athanasius Malankara Metropolitan; Thomas Mar Athanasius Malankara Metropolitan, Titus I Mar Thoma Metropolitan (Mar Thoma XV); Titus II Mar Thoma Metropolitan (Mar Thoma XVI)etc. The former head of the Marthoma Church, Dr. Joseph Mar Thoma Metropolitan (Mar Thoma XXI), is also from this family.

Early life 
Abraham Malpan was born on 30 May 1796 as the second son of Palakunnathu Mathew and Mariamma of Pakalomattathil-Mullasseril (പകലൊമറ്റത്തിൽ-മുല്ലശ്ശേരിൽ) Family, of Mullasseril Family, Chengannur, Kerala. His father died before he was born, and his mother died before he was three; he was brought up by his father's elder brother Mathen Thomma Malpan, a Sannyasi (സന്ന്യാസി)/Celibate/hermit priest. Because the practice of the church at that time was to ordain children as deacons; after completing his primary education Abraham was ordained as deacon. He was then sent to study Syriac and the worship orders under Malpan Korah Kathanar, eventually becoming an expert in the Syriac language. After being ordained as a priest in 1815 by Mar Thoma VIII, he soon became a professor of Syriac, a Malpan, at the Malankara Old Seminary in Kottayam. The priests of that time practised celibacy, a practice that was kept after the brief time under the Roman Catholic Church. However, after the British Anglicans arrived, they encouraged the church to end the mandate of celibacy. Metropolitan Punnuthra Mar Dionysius agreed, and the practice ended. Abraham Malpan was one of the first of the priests to get married for getting the cash prize.

As a clergyman 
According to Church practices and Biblical Instructions, theological students were made deacons at the age of 20 and priests at the age of 30. But during the time just before the reformation small children of 7 years were ordained as deacons by the bishops after taking big bribes from the parents. And people who did not have any theological education were made priests at the age of 16 or 17.

After his Malayalam Education Malpan was sent to study Syriac, the language of the liturgy, under Padinjarekutu Korah Malpan, Puthupally. It was a residential discipleship like the ancient Indian Gurukula education. Abraham obtained good fluency in Syriac and the Bible and acquired a sound knowledge of Christian theology. He was ordained as a Semmasson (deacon) in 1811, and received the priestly ordination as a Kassessa (priest) in 1815 from Mar Thoma VIII. He was appointed as the Vicar of Maramon parish.

Reformation 
During the time of Marthoma VI, Anglican missionary Claudius Buchanan visited Malankara. He met Marthoma in 1806. With his help, the Bible was translated from the original Aramaic language and was distributed to the parishes. Soon after his meeting, representatives of the parishes met at Arthat church and declared (Arthat Padiola) that the people should not follow the teachings by Rome. This meeting can be considered to be the beginning of Sucheekarana Prasthanam ('Purification Movement – Reformation) in Malankara Church.

In 1816, Mar Thoma X, (Pulikottil Mar Dionysius) appointed Abraham Malpan as an educator of Syriac at the Kottayam Seminary.

His uncle, Thomma Malpan was of opinion that many of the beliefs that infiltrated into Malankara Church were against the teaching of the Bible. While he was the guardian of Abraham Malpan in his younger days, they talked about restoring the Church to its previous position before the Synod of Diamper. Teaching at the Kottayam Seminary, gave him enough time to read and study the Bible in his mother tongue, Malayalam.

Mar Thoma XI, (Punnathra Mar Dionysius) convened a meeting of representatives of the Malankara Church at Mavelikkara, on 3 December 1818. In that meeting a committee was appointed to recommend reforms in the Church. Abraham Malpan, Kaithayil Geevarghese Malpan, Eruthikkal Markose Kathanar, Adangapurathu Joseph Kathanar were members of this committee. This is considered as the first step in carrying out the Sucheekaranam (Purification – Reformation) in Malankara Church. But after the demise of Mar Thoma XI, things changed. Cheppad Mar Dionysius became Marthoma XII.
 
Due to doubts about the validity of the consecration of Mar Thoma VIII, Abraham Malpan had some doubts about his own ordination. So when a Jacobite bishop from Syria came, he and two others had themselves reordained by him. Dionysius lodged a complaint against them to the government of Travancore and they were fined 336 fanam (Rs. 84) for flouting the authority of the Indian bishop.

In 1835 Bishop of Calcutta Daniel Wilson visited Kerala. He made certain recommendations to Mar Thoma XII, (Cheppattu Mar Dionysius) for the continuation of relationship between the Syrian Church and the Missionaries. Mar Thoma did not like this interference of the Anglican Missionaries in the Church affairs, and convened a meeting of Church representatives at Mavelikkara on 16 January 1836, in which the Synod declared that, "We, the Jacobite Syrians are under the rule of the Patriarch of Antioch ..."

Trumpet Call and Reforms
On 6 September 1836, strategies were formed by a group of 12 senior clergy under the leadership of Abraham Malpan, to initiate reformation. They issued a circular describing what they considered the wrong teachings, and a statement listing twenty-four evil practices which the Church had picked up due to its association with other churches and religions. They sent the same as a petition to governmental authorities; which all started from an order to investigate the reforms that could be made by the metropolitan.

At the time of Purification, a number of reforms were made in church. A few of them are given below.

 Translated and revised the liturgy thus removing the unscriptural practices.
 Abolished prayers for the dead, invocation of saints, and veneration of sacraments. 
 Abolished auricular confession. 
 Introduced the practice of giving Holy Communion to the people in both kinds. 
 Emphasized the reading and study of the Bible, family-worship and evangelistic work.
 Removed pictures and drawings and statues from the churches and places of worship.
 Insisted on a good moral standard of conduct for the laity and simple living for the clergy with high morale.

On Monday 29 August 1836 (Malayalam Era (Kollavarsham) 1012 Chingam 15), the closing day of the 15 Day lent Abraham Malpan celebrated the Holy Qurbana Service in Malayalam directly translating from the Syriac Text at his home parish in Maramon. Clergy who supported him also followed it in various other parishes..

Every year in the first week of October, there was a church festival at Maramon, connected with saintly Maphriyono-Catholicos Mor Baselious Yeldho. A wooden image of the saint named as 'Muthappen' (meaning: Elder Father), was taken around in procession and people used to offer prayers and offerings to it. In 1837, 22 years after taking over as vicar of the parish, Abraham Malpan took the image and threw it into a well saying, "Why consult the dead on behalf of the living?" (Isaiah 8:19) as this practice of veneration and prayer to saints was clearly idolatrous according to various scriptures like Exodus 20:3-5 ( First commandment of God ), Romans 1:25, 1 Corinthians 10:7-14, Revelation 9:20 and idolatry leads to eternal hell fire according to Revelation 21:8 - Holy Bible.

After-effects
Abraham Malpan and Cheppad Philipose Mar Dionysius, were spiritual companions. But when Abraham Malpan used the revised liturgy and brought about changes in practices, that disappointed and offended Marthoma XII who threatened him with excommunication. But Abraham Malpan informed him that if excommunicated, he would not ask to revoke it.  Marthoma XII, did not terminate or laicize Malpan as being a prelate, allowed him to keep the vicar position and suspended Malpan from religious duties; also refused priesthood to the deacons trained under him as a casuistic measure. Abraham Malpan was not disheartened. He continued with the reforms. He returned to Maramon. Many of his students joined him to continue their studies. All those who believed that the church needed to be revitalised also joined him. Members of parishes in Kozhencherry, Ayroor, Kumbanad, Koorthamala, Eraviperoor, Thumpamon, Elanthoor, Kundara, Kottarakara, Mavelikara, Mallapally, and many other places made trips to Maramon to attend the service in Malayalam and listen to his sermons. Doors were also opened for reformation in other places by clergymen who supported him.

At this stage he had three choices in front of him. Repent and go back to the old beliefs; join the Anglican Church with western theology and aid; or go forward with the reformation. He decided to choose the third one.

Mathews Mar Athanasius Metropolitan
Mathews Athanasius was the son of the elder brother of Abraham Malpan and a personally groomed deacon. After completing his studies at Kottayam, he joined at Madras Christian College in Chennai, established by Rev. John Anderson. After completing his collegiate studies and by the spiritual guidance and necessity of Abraham Malpan, Mathews made travel arrangements to go to Antioch for Bishopship, with the help of his teachers in Chennai. It is said that Deacon Mathews had confided his vision and ambition with his friend George Mathen (later Rev.) - "If I live, it would be only for my Mother Church; I will throw away the weeds and restore the Church to its original purity." He was ordained as a Metropolitan (bishop) in February 1842 at Antioch, and held the duties as bishop in the region for a few months and returned home in March 1843. In 1852 he became the Metropolitan of Malankara Syrian Church and headed the entire Orthodox church until 1877. Palakkunnathu Mathews Mar Athanius had ordained many Deacons and Priests, among a Deacon, who became a Saint later on in the Malankara Syrian Church (St. Gregorios of Parumala). In 1868, while he was the Metropolitan of Malankara Syrian Church, he had also ordained his cousin - Palakkunnathu Thomas Mar Athanasius (later took over the matters with the Royal court relative to the disputes with Malankara Syrian Church on behalf of Mathews Mar Athanasius).

Final days 
Abraham Malpan was a diabetic, for which there was no proper treatment at the time. By the age of 50, he became very sick and died on September 9, 1845. He was buried the next day at the Maramon Church. The funeral service was conducted by his nephew Mathews Mar Athanasius Metropolitan, of the Malankara Syrian Church.

Conclusion 
Abraham Malpan is generally viewed as either a conservative radical reformer or a harried schismatic in the annals of Indian Christianity. Due to his untimely death and lack of writings, it is difficult to ascertain what exactly Malpan envisioned, but what is known is that he was a zealous, passionate and stern man. He lived for the edification of the Syrian Church and loved it by disliking and questioning it and trying to redress it through reformation. Due to a lack of resources and biased reports offered by conflicting historians and scribes, it is unclear to what degree he wanted to reform the church, yet the Malpan's beliefs of what should be reformed need not be normative for the church. But what is virtually agreed upon was his unquenchable desire to reform it timely and be biblically sound to what can be counted, and the event as an inspiration in dormancy and as a guide for readiness to change, in the present day.

Citations

References 
English:
 Agur, C.M. (1903). Church History of Travancore. Asian Education Services.
 George Kassessa, Rev.M.C. (1919). Palakunnathu Abraham Malpan. (Biography in Malaylam), CLS, Tiruvalla.
 Juhanon Marthoma Metropolitan, The Most Rev. Dr. (1993). Christianity in India and a Brief History of the Marthoma Syrian Church. Pub: K.M. Cherian.
Mathew, N.M. (2003) History of Palakunnathu Family.
 Zac Varghese Dr. & Mathew A. Kallumpram. (2003). Glimpses of Mar Thoma Church History. London, England.
 Life of Palakunnathu Abraham Malpan 
Malayalam: 
 T.C. Chacko, (2000) Concise history of Malankara Marthoma Suyani Sabha, E.J. Institute, Tiruvalla.
K.N. Daniel,(1952). Udayamperoor Sunnahadosinte Canonukal (Canons of the Synod of Diamper), C.L.S., Tiruvalla.
Eapen, Prof. K.V. (2001) History of Malankara Marthoma Suryani Sabha.
 Mathew, N.M. (2006) History of Malankara Marthoma Church. Volume I (2006), Volume II (2007), Volume III (2008), E.J. Institute, Tiruvalla.

External links 
 Malankara Mar Thoma Syrian Church – Malankara Mar Thoma Syrian Church 
 koala加速器Android版
 Palakunnathu family website

1795 births
1845 deaths
Indian Christian clergy
Malayali people
People from Pathanamthitta
Pakalomattam family
Saint Thomas Christians
Syriac Orthodox clergy